Myrmekes (Μύρμηκες) is Greek for "ants". Greek mythological animals and tribes were called with this name.

Mythology
 Myrmidons, ants transformed into a tribe of people by Zeus.
 Herodotus, wrote about Gold-digging ants in India which were smaller than dogs but larger than foxes. 
 Aelian, wrote: "The Indian ants (μύρμηκες οἱ Ἰνδικοὶ) which guard the gold will not cross the river Campylinus".
 Greek sailors that arrived from India have told stories of their encounters with the Myrmekes. They are a race of ants that can range in size from small dogs to giant bears which guarded a hill that had rich deposits of gold. The local tribes had to use a rush and grab maneuver to obtain the gold without being killed by the Myrmekes.

Cultural depictions
 The Myrmekes appeared in the Percy Jackson & the Olympians book The Demigod Files where they were seen in the story "The Bronze Dragon." They end up capturing Charlie Beckendorf when he tries to retrieve a Bronze Dragon head that they have found. Silena Beauregard helped Percy Jackson and Annabeth Chase to reassemble the Bronze Dragon so that it can help rescue Charlie from the Myrmekes where the Bronze Dragon causes havoc upon the Myrmekes' anthill.
 They also appear in The Hidden Oracle story of The Trials of Apollo. While the god Apollo and his friend, Meg McCaffrey, were walking through the forest to search for two of Apollo's missing kids, they come across the shell of a Myrmekes, which had been cracked in half. Apollo suspected that a strong animal had bit the ant in half. Later, when the two met the Palikoi (geyser gods), one of them, Pete, shined a spotlight and attracted the attention of three Myrmekes. After a fight, the ants captured Meg. Later on, when Apollo rescued Meg, they encountered the queen ant, which was about three times bigger than the rest of the ants.

See also
Gold-digging ant

References

External links
 Myrmekes at Theoi.com
 Myrmekes at Mythical Creatures List

Greek legendary creatures
Mythological insects
Indian legendary creatures
Gold